William Bullick Black KC (22 September 1879 – 11 March 1967) was an Irish judge and barrister who served as a Judge of the Supreme Court from 1942 to 1951.

Early life and education
Black was born in Holywood, County Down, in 1879. Black's father, James, was a Methodist minister. He was educated at Methodist College Belfast and later at Trinity College Dublin.

Career
Black attended the King's Inns, Dublin, where he qualified as a barrister. At King's Inns he won a number of debating and oratorical prizes before he was called to the Bar in 1901.

Black was a campaigner for Sinn Féin before later supporting Fianna Fáil.

In 1942, he was made a judge of the Supreme Court of Ireland and served until 1951. He dissented against the ruling in the Corcoran case (1950) and also the 1951 Tilson case that enforced the Ne Temere decree.

The Council of Europe elected Black as Ireland's representative in the European Commission of Human Rights in 1954.

Personal life
He was married to Julia O'Connor.

References

1879 births
1967 deaths
People educated at Methodist College Belfast
Irish barristers
Judges of the Supreme Court of Ireland
20th-century Irish lawyers
People from County Down
Alumni of Trinity College Dublin
Members of the King's Inns
Alumni of King's Inns